The Global Centre for Pluralism is an international centre for research, education and exchange about the values, practices and policies that underpin pluralist societies. Based in Ottawa, Ontario, Canada, the Centre seeks to assist the creation of successful societies.

The Global Centre for Pluralism is an international initiative of Aga Khan IV, 49th hereditary Imam of Ismaili Muslims, and was established jointly with the Government of Canada in 2006. It is located in the former Canadian War Museum building along Ottawa's Sussex Drive and was officially opened with Governor General of Canada, the Right Honourable David Johnston on May 16, 2017.

Board of directors
The Board of Directors of the Global Centre for Pluralism are the following:
 His Highness the Aga Khan, (Chairman of the Board) Founder and Chairman of the Aga Khan Development Network (AKDN) and 49th hereditary Imam of the Shia Ismaili Muslims;
 Princess Zahra Aga Khan, Head of the AKDN's Social Welfare department;
 Iain Benson, Canadian lawyer and Professor of Law at the University of the Free State in Bloemfontein;
 The Right Honourable Adrienne Clarkson, former Governor General of Canada;
 Huguette Labelle, Chancellor of the University of Ottawa;
 Azim Nanji, Senior Associate Director for the Abbasi Program in Islamic Studies at Stanford University;
 Margaret Ogilvie, Chancellor's Professor of Law, Carleton University;
 Khalil Shariff, Chief Executive Officer of the Aga Khan Foundation Canada and
 Eduardo Stein, diplomat and former Vice President of Guatemala
 Beverley McLachlin, former Chief Justice of Canada

Building

The Global Centre for Pluralism is located at 330 Sussex Drive in Ottawa, a building that served as the home of the Public Archives of Canada from 1906 to 1967 and the Canadian War Museum from 1967 to 2005. The building was built from 1904 to 1906 and is designated a National Historic Site of Canada and a Classified Federal Heritage Building.

Profile of activities 
The Centre is a think-tank for studying and fostering pluralism.

The Centre honours people, for efforts to build an inclusive society, with the Global Pluralism Awards. 

 2017 Awards: Presented for the first time on November 15, 2017, with the winners being Leyner Palacios Asprilla of Colombia, Alice Wairimu Nderitu of Kenya, and Daniel Webb of Australia. 
 2019 Awards: Presented on November 20, 2019, with the winners being Deborah Ahenkorah of Ghana, the Center for Social Integrity of Myanmar, and ‘Learning History That Is Not Yet History’ of Bosnia and Herzegovina, Croatia, Montenegro and Serbia.
 2021 Awards: Presented virtually on February 23, 2022, with the winners being Hand in Hand: Center for Jewish-Arab Education in Israel, Namati Kenya of Kenya, and Puja Kapai of Hong Kong.

Each year, the Centre hosts its Annual Pluralism Lecture. The lecturers have been:

 2012 – Former President of the Kyrgyz Republic Roza Otunbayeva
 2013 – Former Secretary General of the United Nations Kofi Annan
 2014 – Former UN High Commissioner for Refugees Antonio Guterres
 2015 – Chief Justice of the Supreme Court of Canada Beverly McLachlin
 2016 – Justice Albie Sachs
 2018 – Author Karen Armstrong
 2019 – Deputy Secretary General of the United Nations Amina J. Mohammed
 2021 – Author Maaza Mengiste

See also 

Delegation of the Ismaili Imamat

References

External links 
 Global Centre for Pluralism website

Pluralism
Buildings and structures in Ottawa
Pluralism (philosophy)
Sussex Drive